The 1999 UAW-GM Quality 500 was the 29th stock car race of the 2001 NASCAR Winston Cup Series and the 42nd iteration of the event. The race was originally scheduled to be held on Sunday, October 10, 1999, but was delayed to Monday, October 11 due to inclement weather. The race was held in front of an audience of 125,000 in Concord, North Carolina, at Lowe's Motor Speedway, a 1.5 miles (2.4 km) permanent quad-oval. The race took the scheduled 334 laps to complete. In the closing laps of the race, Hendrick Motorsports driver Jeff Gordon would manage to close in and pass for the lead with eight to go to take his 49th career NASCAR Winston Cup Series victory and his seventh and final victory of the season. To fill out the podium, Joe Gibbs Racing driver Bobby Labonte and Richard Childress Racing driver Mike Skinner would finish second and third, respectively.

Background 

Lowe's Motor Speedway is a motorsports complex located in Concord, North Carolina, United States 13 miles from Charlotte, North Carolina. The complex features a 1.5 miles (2.4 km) quad oval track that hosts NASCAR racing including the prestigious Coca-Cola 600 on Memorial Day weekend and the NEXTEL All-Star Challenge, as well as the UAW-GM Quality 500. The speedway was built in 1959 by Bruton Smith and is considered the home track for NASCAR with many race teams located in the Charlotte area. The track is owned and operated by Speedway Motorsports Inc. (SMI) with Marcus G. Smith (son of Bruton Smith) as track president.

Entry list 

 (R) denotes rookie driver.

Practice

First practice 
The first practice session was held on Wednesday, October 6, at 2:00 PM EST. The session would last for three hours.

Second practice 
The second practice session was held on Thursday, October 7, at 9:00 AM EST. The session would last for 55 minutes.

Third practice 
The third practice session was held on Thursday, October 7, at 12:35 PM EST. The session would last for 40 minutes.

Final practice 
The final practice session, sometimes referred to as Happy Hour, was held on Saturday, October 9, after the preliminary 1999 All Pro Bumper to Bumper 300. The session would last for one hour.

Qualifying 
Qualifying was split into two rounds. The first round was held on Wedesnday, October 6, at 7:00 PM EST. Each driver would have one lap to set a time. During the first round, the top 25 drivers in the round would be guaranteed a starting spot in the race. If a driver was not able to guarantee a spot in the first round, they had the option to scrub their time from the first round and try and run a faster lap time in a second round qualifying run, held on Thursday, October 7, at 10:45 AM EST. As with the first round, each driver would have one lap to set a time. Positions 26-36 would be decided on time, while positions 37-43 would be based on provisionals. Six spots are awarded by the use of provisionals based on owner's points. The seventh is awarded to a past champion who has not otherwise qualified for the race. If no past champion needs the provisional, the next team in the owner points will be awarded a provisional.

Seven drivers would fail to qualify: Darrell Waltrip, Buckshot Jones, Dave Marcis, Ed Berrier, Gary Bradberry, Hut Stricklin, and Andy Hillenburg.

Full qualifying results

Race results

References 

1999 NASCAR Winston Cup Series
NASCAR races at Charlotte Motor Speedway
October 1999 sports events in the United States
1999 in sports in North Carolina